Garmabrud (also Romanized as Garmābrūd; also known as Garmārūd) is a village in Layl Rural District, in the Central District of Lahijan County, Gilan Province, Iran. At the 2006 census, its population was 87, in 27 families.

References 

Populated places in Lahijan County